is a 2019 Japanese political and comedy film directed by Kōki Mitani. It stars Kiichi Nakai. Mitani wrote a script for a similar political drama series Sōrito Yobanaide aired on Fuji TV in 1997.

Plot
The main character of the film is the prime minister, who is hated by the people as he is a corrupt politician. One day, a stone thrown by a man who hates Prime Minister Keisuke Kuroda hits Kuroda's head, causing memory loss; he wakes up in a hospital. He watches TV and is surprised to find out that he is the prime minister hated by people.

Cast

 Kiichi Nakai as the Prime Minister Keisuke Kuroda
 Dean Fujioka as Isaka
 Yuriko Ishida as Satoko Kuroda
 Eiko Koike as Nozomi Banba
 Yuki Saito as Suga-san
 Takashi Yamaguchi
 Kei Tanaka as Heitarō Ōzeki
 Takahiro Fujimoto
 Takaya Sakoda
 Zen Kajihara
 Takashi Kobayashi
 Kenji Anan
 Yoshimasa Kondō
 Kazuki Iio
 Junpei Gotō
 Jay Kabira
 Yuta Ozawa
 Yūki Amami
 Yumiko Udō as a news presenter 
 Tatsuomi Hamada as Atsuhiko Kuroda
 Susumu Terajima
 Rolly Teranishi
 Kōichi Yamadera as Various Voices
 Emma Miyazawa as Jet Wada
 Yō Yoshida as Akane Yamanishi
 Yoshino Kimura as the president of the United States
 Masao Kusakari as Daigo Tsurumaru
 Kōichi Satō as Tasuku Furugōri

Awards
 Hochi Film Award Best Actor : Kiichi Nakai
 Blue Ribbon Awards Best Actor : Kiichi Nakai

References

External links
Kioku ni Gozaimasen at Toho

2019 films
2010s Japanese-language films
Japanese comedy films
Japanese political films
2019 comedy films
2010s Japanese films
Films produced by Kazutoshi Wadakura